Micrurus hemprichii, commonly known as Hemprichi's coral snake, is a species of venomous coral snake in the family Elapidae from South America.

Etymology
The specific name, hemprichii, is in honor of German naturalist Wilhelm Friedrich Hemprich.

Habitat
Hemprichi's coral snake occurs in forests at elevations below , including lower montane wet forest, gallery forest, and primary and secondary rain forest. It is a cryptic species living in leaf litter of the forest floor.

Diet
Hemprichi's coral snake feeds heavily on velvet worms, but also on small snakes and amphisbaenids.

Geographic range
M. hemprichii is found in the upper Amazon Basin, Guiana Highlands, and upper Orinoco Basin in Venezuela, Colombia, Ecuador, Peru, Bolivia, Brazil, Guyana, Surinam, and French Guiana.

Subspecies
Two subspecies are recognized as being valid.
Micrurus hemprichii hemprichii 
Micrurus hemprichii ortoni 

Nota bene: A trinomial authority in parentheses indicates that the subspecies was originally described in a genus other than Micrurus.

References

Further reading
Boulenger GA (1896). Catalogue of the Snakes in the British Museum (Natural History). Volume III., Containing the Colubridæ (Opisthoglyphæ and Proteroglyphæ) ... London: Trustees of the British Museum (Natural History). (Taylor and Francis, printers). xiv + 727 pp. + Plates I-XXV. (Elaps hemprichii, p. 421).
Freiberg M (1982). Snakes of South America. Hong Kong: T.F.H. Publications. 189 pp. . (Micrurus hemprichii, p. 115).
Jan [G] (1858). "Plan d'une Iconographie descriptive des Ophidiens et Description sommaire de nouvelles espèces de Serpents ". Revue et Magasin de Zoologie Pure et Appliquée, Paris, 2e Série [Series 2] 10: 438-449, 514-527. (Elaps hemprichii, new species, pp. 523–524). (in French).
Schmidt KP (1953). "Hemprich's Coral Snake Micrurus hemprichi [sic]". Fieldiana Zool. 34 (13): 165-170. (Micrurus hemprichi [sic] ortoni, new subspecies, pp. 166–168).

External links
"Micrurus hemprichii " at Coral Snakes of the World. https://web.archive.org/web/20160405124918/http://www.coralsnake.net/micrurus/hemprichs-coral-snake.html

hemprichii
Snakes of South America
Reptiles of Bolivia
Reptiles of Brazil
Reptiles of Colombia
Reptiles of Ecuador
Reptiles of French Guiana
Reptiles of Guyana
Reptiles of Peru
Reptiles of Suriname
Reptiles of Venezuela
Fauna of the Amazon
Reptiles described in 1858
Taxa named by Giorgio Jan